Matrix Games is a publisher of PC games, specifically strategy games and wargames. It is based in Ohio, US, and Surrey, UK. 

Their focus is primarily but not exclusively on wargames and turn-based strategy. The product line-up also includes space sims (Starshatter: The Gathering Storm),  sports management sims (Maximum-Football), and real-time strategy titles (Close Combat: Cross of Iron).

Matrix Games publishes games from a variety of developers, including SSG, 2by3 Games, Panther Games, Koios Works, Destroyer Studios, Western-Civilization and AGEOD.

History
Matrix Games was founded by David Heath and Shaun Wallace in 1999 in Staten Island, New York City. As of January 2010, Matrix Games has published over 75 titles. Matrix has in-house artists, programmers, and producers which all take active roles in projects of smaller wargame developers who lack the resources to hire full-time staff otherwise.

In May 2010, Matrix Games and Slitherine announced a merger of the two companies making it the largest wargaming specialist publisher. Matrix Games also publishes wargames for the US defense industry.

Awards
Awards won for Matrix Games products include:

PC Gamers Editors' Choice Award 93% for Korsun Pocket November 2003
Computer Games Magazine – Top 10 of 2005 for Star Chamber
Computer Gaming World – Wargame of the Year for Korsun Pocket 2003
Computer Gaming World – Wargame of the Year for Battles in Normandy 2004
32nd Annual Origins Awards 2006 Vanguard Award for World At War
32nd Annual Origins Awards 2006 Lock n' Load Band of Heroes
Charles S. Roberts Award 2007 for Guns of August
Charles S. Roberts Award 2007 for Empires in Arms

Games
 Across the Dnepr: Korsun Pocket Add-on
 Across the Dnepr: Second Edition
 Advanced Tactics: Gold
 Armada 2526
 Armored Brigade
 Banzai!: For Pacific Fighters
 Battlefront
 Battleground Europe – World War II Online
 Battlegrounds: American Civil War
 Battlegrounds: Napoleonic Wars
 Birth of America
 Blitzkrieg: War in Europe 1939–1945
 Campaign Series: Matrix Edition
 Campaigns On The Danube
 Carriers at War
 Case Blue: For IL-2 or Forgotten Battles
 Chariots of War
 Close Combat: Cross of Iron
 Close Combat: Modern Tactics
 Close Combat: Wacht am Rhein
 Close Combat: The Longest Day
 Combined Arms: World War II
 Command Ops: Battles from the Bulge
 Command: Modern Air / Naval Operations
 Commander: Europe at War Gold
 Conquest! Medieval Realms
 Conquest of the Aegean
 Crown of Glory: Emperor's Edition
 Decisive Battles of WWII: Battles in Italy
 Decisive Battles of WWII: Battles in Normandy
 Decisive Battles of WWII: Korsun Pocket
 Distant Worlds
 Empire in Arms: The Napoleonic Wars of 1805–1815
 Field of Glory series
 Flashpoint Germany
 For Liberty!
 Forge of Freedom: The American Civil War 1861–1865
 Gary Grigsby's Eagle Day to Bombing the Reich
 Gary Grigsby's War in the East: The German-Soviet War 1941–1945
 Gary Grigsby's World at War
 Gates of Troy
 Guns of August
 Hannibal: Rome and Carthage in the Second Punic War (designed by Forced March Games)
 Harpoon 3: Advanced Naval Warfare
 Highway to the Reich
 Hired Guns: The Jagged Edge
 Horse and Musket: Volume 1
 Legion Arena Gold
 Lock 'n Load: Band of Heroes
 Mark H. Walker's Lock 'n Load: Heroes of Stalingrad
 Massive Assault
 Maximum-Football
 Norm Koger's The Operational Art of War III
 Officers: The Matrix Edition
 Operation Barbarossa – The Struggle for Russia
 Pacific War: Matrix Edition
 Panzer Command: Operation Winter Storm
 Panzer Command: Kharkov
 Panzer Command: Ostfront
 Panzercorps: Wehrmacht
 PureSim Baseball 2007
 Reach for the Stars
 Scourge of War: Gettysburg
 Scourge of War: Antietam
 Scourge of War: Pipe Creek
 Scourge of War: Chancellorsville
 Scourge of War: Brandy Station
 Shadow Empire
 Smugglers IV – Doomsday
 Spartan
 Star Chamber: The Harbinger Saga
 Starshatter: The Gathering Storm
 Starships Unlimited – Divided Galaxies
 Starships Unlimited v3
 Steel Panthers: World at War – Generals Edition
 Storm Over the Pacific
 Strategic Command WWII Global Conflict
 Strategic Command Classic: WWI
 Strategic Command Classic: WWII
 Strategic Command: World War I
 Strategic Command WWII: Community Pack - DLC
 Strategic Command WWII: War in Europe
 Strategic Command WWII: World at War
 Supremacy: Four Paths To Power
 The Last Days: For IL-2 Forgotten Battles
 Tin Soldiers: Alexander the Great
 Tin Soldiers: Julius Caesar
 Titans of Steel: Warring Suns
 UFO: Extraterrestrials
 Uncommon Valor
 War in Russia: Matrix Edition
 War in the Pacific
 War in the Pacific: Admiral's Edition
 WarPlan
 WarPlan Pacific
 War Plan Orange: Dreadnoughts in the Pacific 1922–1930
 World in Flames
 World War One: La Grande Guerra
 World War One Gold
 World War II: General Commander
 World War 2: Time of Wrath

References

External links

Video game companies established in 1999
Video game companies of the United Kingdom
Video game companies of the United States
Video game publishers
1999 establishments in England